TV Midtvest is one of eight regional TV-stations in the TV 2 network in Denmark, covering the Central and Western Jutland. The station was founded in 1989. TV Midtvest is broadcasting from Holstebro. The regional TV 2 stations are given the time slots 18.20-18.25 and 19.30-20.00 every day of the week.

Television stations in Denmark
Mass media in Holstebro
Television channels and stations established in 1989